The Sweden men's national handball team is controlled by the Swedish Handball Association. Its most successful periods were under coaches Curt Wadmark (1948–1967) and Bengt Johansson (1988–2004). The team under Bengt Johansson, nicknamed Bengan Boys in Sweden, is regarded as one of the finest national teams in the history of the sport with players like Tomas Svensson, Staffan Olsson, Magnus Wislander and Stefan Lövgren. From 1990 through 2002 the team reached the medal round in every championship (6 World Championships, 5 European Championships and 3 Olympic Games, earning 13 medals in total) and qualified for a record 8 championship finals in a row 1996–2002.

Sweden is the most successful nation at the European Men's Handball Championship with 5 titles, and has won the most medals in the history of the World Men's Handball Championship with a total tally of 12 medals (as of 2023, this is a record shared with France). Conversely, Sweden has yet to win an Olympic title despite participating in 4 finals (Sweden participated in the 1952 Summer Olympics in a demonstration match, defeating Denmark 19–11). The team has also won the World Cup 3 times, the Supercup 2 times, and were Intercontinental Cup winners in 2000.

Honours

Competitive record
 Champions   Runners-up   Third place   Fourth place

Olympic Games

World Championship

European Championship

*Denotes draws include knockout matches decided on penalty throws.
**Gold background color indicates that the tournament was won. Red border color indicates tournament was held on home soil.

Team

Current squad
Squad for the 2023 World Championship.

Appearances and goals correct as of 9 January 2023.

Head coach:  Glenn Solberg

Notable players
Per Carlén
Björn "Lurch" Andersson
Bengt Johansson
Stefan Lövgren
Mats Olsson
Staffan Olsson
Magnus Wislander
Ljubomir Vranjes
Pierre Thorsson
Magnus Andersson
Ola Lindgren
Erik Hajas
Johan Petersson
Peter Gentzel
Tomas Svensson
Kim Andersson
Martin Frändesjö

Coaches

World & European Records

World Records
 Longest undefeated streak in international championships (25 matches, Euro 1998 - 2000 Olympic Games).
 Longest medal round streak in major championships (14 tournaments, 1990-2002).
 Longest medal round streak in the World Championships (7 tournaments, 1986-2001).
 8 consecutive finals in international championships (1996-2002).
 Most World Championship finals (8 - shared with France).
 3 consecutive World Championship finals (1997, 1999, 2001 - shared with Denmark).

European Records
 Most finals reached in international championships (18).
 Most medals in international competition (22 - shared with France).
 3 consecutive gold medals at the European championship (1998, 2000, 2002).

Other merits
 First European nation to win a major championship title three times in a row (Euro 1998, Euro 2000, Euro 2002).
 3 x winners of the World Cup (1992, 1996, 2004)
 2 x winners of the Supercup (1993, 2005)
 1 x winners of the Intercontinental Cup (2000)
 The first IHF World Champion (1954 - indoor handball) (Germany's 1938 victory was under the IAHF).
 The first EHF European Champion (1994).
 Defeated Denmark 18-12 in Copenhagen in the first ever international indoor handball game (8 March 1935).

Kit supplier
From 2004 to 2015 Sweden's kits were supplied by Adidas, and 2016-2019 by Kempa. The current supplier is Craft.

See also
Sweden women's national handball team

References

External links

IHF profile

Handball in Sweden
Men's national handball teams
Handball